The Coalspur Formation is an Upper Cretaceous to lower Palaeocene stratigraphic unit of the Western Canada Sedimentary Basin in the foothills of southwestern Alberta. Its deposition spanned the time interval from latest Cretaceous (Maastrichtian) to early Palaeocene, and it includes sediments that were deposited before, during, and after the Cretaceous-Paleogene (K-Pg) extinction event. It includes the economically important coal deposits of the Coalspur Coal Zone, as well as nonmarine plant and animal fossils.

Lithology
The sediments of the Coalspur Formation were eroded from the Canadian Cordillera, and were transported eastward by river systems and deposited in fluvial channel and floodplain environments. The formation consists primarily of sandstones and siltstones, interbedded with mudstones and minor amounts of bentonite. Thick coal seams are present locally in the upper portion of the formation, especially in the Alberta Coal Branch area southeast of Hinton, Alberta. Near the Athabasca River the base consists primarily of conglomerate and is known as the Entrance Conglomerate.

Stratigraphy and age
The Coalspur Formation is part of the Saunders group. The K-Pg boundary has been identified within the formation at the base of the lowermost coal seam (the Mynheer seam), based on changes in the fossil pollen assemblage and the presence of an iridium anomaly. The boundary subdivides the Coalspur Formation into an upper member called the Coalspur coal zone which is of early Paleocene age, and an unnamed lower member of latest Cretaceous age.

Thickness and distribution
The Coalspur Formation is present in the Alberta foothills from south of the Wapiti River to the North Saskatchewan River.

Relationship to other units
The Coalspur Formation rests abruptly on the Brazeau Formation and is overlain abruptly by the Paskapoo Formation. It is equivalent to the Scollard Formation of the west-central Alberta plains, the Willow Creek Formation in the southwestern plains, and part or all of the Ravenscrag Formation in Saskatchewan. The base of the Coalspur coal zone is equivalent to the base of the Ardley coal zone, which is also floored on the K-Pg boundary bed.

Paleontology
Plant fossils and mammal remains have been described from the Coalspur Formation, but although the lower part of the formation is of Late Cretaceous age, no dinosaur remains have yet been reported.

Fossils reported from the Coalspur Formation: 
 Batrachosauroididae
 Opisthotriton kayi

 Mammals
 Neoplagiaulax cf. nanophus
 N. cf. nelsoni
 Simpsonictis cf. jaynanneae
 Aphronorus sp.
 Baiotomeus sp.
 Colpoclaenus sp.
 Mimetodon sp.
 Pararyctes sp.
 Parectypodus sp.
 Promioclaenus sp.
 Propalaeosinopa sp.
 Ptilodus sp.
 Condylarthra indet.
 Lipotyphla indet.
 Neoplagiaulacidae indet.
 Paromomyidae indet.
 Creodonta indet.

Resources
The coal is of sub-bituminous B to C rank, with a low sulphur content. It is mined in the Alberta Coal Branch area and shipped to electric power generating stations in Canada and abroad.

See also 
 List of fossiliferous stratigraphic units in Alberta
 Edmonton Group
 Hell Creek Formation
 Coal in Alberta

References

External links 
 

Geologic formations of Canada
Western Canadian Sedimentary Basin
Paleogene Alberta
Cretaceous Alberta
Paleocene North America
Cretaceous–Paleogene boundary
Maastrichtian Stage of North America
Danian Stage
Sandstone formations
Siltstone formations
Shale formations
Coal formations
Coal in Canada
Paleontology in Alberta